Gomyek-e Vosta (also Romanized as Gomyek-e Vosţá; also known as Gomīk and Gom Yek) is a village in Holayjan Rural District, in the Central District of Izeh County, Khuzestan Province, Iran. At the 2006 census, its population was 92, in 17 families.

References 

Populated places in Izeh County